The Central Baptist Church is a historic church in Miami, Florida. It is located at 500 Northeast 1st Avenue. On January 4, 1989, it was added to the U.S. National Register of Historic Places. On October 21, 2007, Central Baptist Church voted to merge with Christ Fellowship, originally named First Baptist Church of Perrine. The church was built in 1925.

The Central Baptist Church is directly served by the Miami Metrorail at Government Center via free transfers to the Metromover, which provides direct service to the College North station. The church is also within walking distance from the Historic Overtown/Lyric Theatre Metrorail station.

References

External links

 Dade County listings at National Register of Historic Places
 Florida's Office of Cultural and Historical Programs
 Dade County listings
 Central Baptist Church
 Christ Fellowship
 Miami Church Finder 
 
 
 

miamiu
Churches in Miami
Baptist churches in Florida
National Register of Historic Places in Miami
Renaissance Revival architecture in Florida
Neoclassical architecture in Florida
Churches completed in 1926
1926 establishments in Florida
Neoclassical church buildings in the United States